GLBC may refer to:

 The stock ticker symbol GBLC, for Global Crossing
 Great Lakes Bible College, a private Christian university in Waterloo, Ontario, Canada
 Great Lakes Christian College (formerly Great Lakes Bible College), a private Christian university in Delta Township, Michigan, United States
 Great Lakes Brewing Company
 Google Local Business Center